Vabres is the name or part of the name of several communes in France:

 Vabres, Cantal
 Vabres, Gard
 Vabres, former commune of the Haute-Loire department, now part of Alleyras
 Vabres-l'Abbaye, in the Aveyron department
 Vabre, in the Tarn department
 Vabre-Tizac, in the Aveyron department

Vabres may also refer to:
 Ancient Diocese of Vabres

oc:Trève